Janet Morrissey is a former Canadian National figure skating champion. She is the 1978 Nebelhorn Trophy bronze medalist, 1978 Grand Prix International St. Gervais bronze medalist, and 1979 Canadian national champion.

Life and career 
Morrissey won the Canadian national novice bronze medal in 1974 and the junior bronze medal in 1977.

She began the 1978–79 season with bronze medals at the Nebelhorn Trophy in Germany and Grand Prix International St. Gervais in France. She went on to win the senior national title ahead of Heather Kemkaran and was sent to Vienna to compete at the 1979 World Championships, where she finished 19th. Her skating club was Nepean FSC.

After failing to  gain a place on the 1980 Olympic team (due to losing her Canadian title to Heather Kemkaren, and only 1 spot being available to the Olympics for Canadian women) and being bypassed for worlds in favor of rising star Tracy Wainmann, Janet first took a break from skating, which turned into an eventual retirement.

Morrissey was known mostly as an overall consistent competitor and strong jumper.   She had a rock solid triple salchow, which she rarely missed, and regularly delivering a triple salchow, several double axels, and a full arsenal of double jumps and double combinations in her program, had strong technical content for her time.

Morrissey studied computer science at Carleton University. She graduated in spring 1983.

Results

References

skatabase

Navigation

Canadian female single skaters
Living people
Year of birth missing (living people)